Milo McIver State Park is a state park in the U.S. state of Oregon. It is in Clackamas County along the Clackamas River, near Estacada and close to Mount Hood.

History
The park was named in honor of Milo K. McIver. McIver was an Oregon Highway Commission member from April 1, 1950, to March 31, 1962, and commission chairman from April 1, 1958, to March 31, 1962. McIver set a record for long service with the commission. His 12-year term exceeded by a year and a half that of Ben R. Chandler. During his term as chairman, Oregon led all other states in opening interstate freeways.

In 1970, the park was the site of Vortex I, a government-sponsored music festival.

Flora and fauna
The park contains a colony of Townsend's big-eared bats, considered a sensitive species in Oregon.

The largest Yew in Oregon is located in the park.

Amenities
The park has many amenities for various activities, including day use and overnight camping, primitive camp sites, hiking and horse trails, boating, bird watching and a disc golf course.
The equestrian trail system and facilities include: a very large parking area, portable toilets, a covered picnic area, a handicapped mounting ramp, a regular mounting block, an outdoor warm-up arena, a small round pen, and several training stations along the upper trail loop. There are also two small bridges over small streams. The park's master plan calls for the construction of a horse camping area as well.

References

Parks in Clackamas County, Oregon
State parks of Oregon